Eugene Goodilin (born 18 November 1969) is Russian chemist and material scientist.

Biography
In 2006 was elected in the Russian Academy of Science and became the youngest corresponding member.

In 2015, a group of researchers from Lomonosov Moscow State University under the direction of Goodilin developed a unique method of performing nondestructive analysis of the electron transport chain in living mitochondria, using surface-enhanced Raman spectroscopy. Their work in this area was published in the journal Scientific Reports.

References

Russian chemists
1969 births
Living people